Magnus Gustafsson and Magnus Larsson were the defending champions, but they did not participate this year.

David Adams and Jeff Tarango won the title by defeating Nicklas Kulti and Mikael Tillström, 7–6 (8–6), 6–4 in the final.

Seeds
Champion seeds are indicated in bold text while text in italics indicates the round in which those seeds were eliminated.

Draw

Finals

References

Doubles
Swedish Open